Hapsford is a village and former civil parish, now in the parish of Dunham-on-the-Hill and Hapsford, in the unitary authority of Cheshire West and Chester and the ceremonial county of Cheshire, England. It is located on the A5117 road, with Helsby to the east and the village of Elton, near Ellesmere Port, to the north west. Junction 14 of the M56 motorway and Chester services motorway service station are sited nearby.

At the 2001 Census the population of Hapsford civil parish was recorded as 129, increasing slightly to 133 at the 2011 census. The civil parish was abolished in 2015 to form Dunham-on-the-Hill and Hapsford, part also went to Manley.

See also

Listed buildings in Hapsford

References

External links

Villages in Cheshire
Former civil parishes in Cheshire
Cheshire West and Chester